In Concert is the third officially released live album by American folk rock duo America, released by King Biscuit Records in 1995. The concert itself was recorded on September 4, 1982 at the Blossom Music Center in Cuyahoga Falls, Ohio, for an installment of the King Biscuit Flower Hour radio show.

King Biscuit has released this concert in at least four different packages since it first came on the market in 1995 (see "Alternative cover art"). In 2000, a 10 song cut-down version was released with the title "Live".  The 2003 edition was titled Greatest Hits Live.

Though it shares the same title, In Concert has no content in common with America's 1985 In Concert album.

Track listing
"Tin Man" (Dewey Bunnell) (3:48)
"Old Man Took" (Bunnell) (3:41)
"Daisy Jane" (Gerry Beckley) (2:55)
"Love on the Vine" (Bill Mumy, Bunnell, Robert Haimer) (2:55)
"Ventura Highway" (Bunnell) (3:44)
"I Need You" (Beckley) (2:32)
"Inspector Mills" (Beckley) (4:35)
"California Dreamin'" (John Phillips, Michelle Phillips) (3:19)
"Never Be Lonely" (3:58)
"You Can Do Magic" (Russ Ballard) (3:45)
"Sandman" (Bunnell) (5:11)
"Here" (Beckley) (6:49)
"Sister Golden Hair" (Beckley) (4:00)
"A Horse with No Name" (Bunnell) (3:56)

Alternative cover art

References

1995 live albums
America (band) albums